Michael Louis Hohensee (born February 22, 1961) is a former professional football quarterback who played in the United States Football League, Canadian Football League, National Football League and Arena Football League. He most recently the head coach of the AFL's Portland Thunder. He played college football at the University of Minnesota, and was in the AFL for two seasons, from 1987 to 1988. Hohensee has been a head coach since 1990, beginning at the Washington Commandos. He has served as head coach of eight different arena football franchises, winning ArenaBowl XX with the Chicago Rush in 2006.

Playing career

College
In college, Hohensee played for the University of Minnesota. After coming out of junior college at Mt. San Antonio College in Walnut, California, Hohensee quarterbacked the Gophers for two seasons in 1981 and 1982, setting numerous school passing records. Mike is also in the University of Minnesota Sports Hall of Fame.

Playing career
He played for the Washington Federals of the United States Football League from 1983 to 1984, the Ottawa Rough Riders and Toronto Argonauts of the Canadian Football League in 1985, and was a replacement player on the Chicago Bears of the National Football League during the 1987 NFL strike.  As the Washington Federals' quarterback in 1983, Hohensee is best remembered for coming up one foot short of the goal line in a loss to the Oakland Invaders.

Before beginning his career as an Arena Football League coach, Hohensee was a quarterback for the AFL's Pittsburgh Gladiators during the league's first two seasons in 1987 and 1988.  He threw the first touchdown pass in AFL history.

Coaching career

Chicago Rush, AFL 2001–2008
Hohensee was named the first coach in Chicago Rush history, with the team beginning play in 2001. With Hohensee, the Rush made the playoffs in every season, winning ArenaBowl XX. The Rush played in four consecutive AFL Conference Championship games from 2004 to 2008, and won its division in 2002, 2004, 2007, and 2008. "Coach Ho" recorded his 100th career victory in 2006 when the team defeated the Las Vegas Gladiators at Allstate Arena.

Peoria Pirates, AF2 2009
When the AFL stopped play in 2009, Hohensee remained in Arena Football in Illinois. He coached the Peoria Pirates, but the team finished 5-11.

Chicago Rush, AFL 2010
Hohensee returned to coach the Rush when the AFL returned for the 2010 season. He led the Rush to a 10–6 season, and the team made the playoffs. On August 20, 2010, Hohensee announced he was resigning from the Rush after nine season with the team. He finished with 108 regular season wins for the Rush and nine more in the playoffs.

Philadelphia Soul, AFL 2011
Hohensee was hired at the coach of the Philadelphia Soul on August 31, 2010. He was the team's first head coach since the team went on hiatus together with the league as a whole following the 2008 season. The team's last game prior to Hohensee's hire was ArenaBowl XXII in which they defeated the San Jose SaberCats 59–56. After a 6–12 season, Hohensee resigned on July 27, 2011.

Iowa Barnstormers, AFL 2012–2014
On August 16, 2011, Hohensee was named the head coach of the Iowa Barnstormers. On August 4, 2014, it was announced that his contract would not be renewed. During his three seasons as Barnstormers coach, he posted a 19–35 record and failed to make the postseason once.

Portland Thunder, AFL 2015
On September 24, 2014, Hohensee was named the head coach of the Portland Thunder. After a 5–13 record, and 3rd-place finish in the Pacific Division, Hohensee's contract was not renewed.  Has since become inactive as an AFL coach.

McDaniel College, Green Terror
In 2016 Hohensee become the pass game & quarterbacks coordinator at McDaniel College, an NCAA Division III liberal arts college. Hohensee joined the Green Terror with fellow Arena Football hall of fame coach Mike Dailey.

Judson University, Eagles
In 2019 Hohensee become the Football Advisor to the University President and the football program at Judson University, a liberal arts college that is a member of the NAIA and the Mid-States Football Association conference. Hohensee consults with the coaching staff and advises the University leadership on aspects of leading and managing a football program.

Head coaching record

Accomplishments
ArenaBowl XX winning coach
Reached AFL Semifinals – 1994, 1995, 1996, 2002, 2004, 2005, 2006, 2007
Division Winner—1995, 1996, 2002, 2004, 2007, 2008

Car accident
On Saturday April 28, 2007 Hohensee was hit by a car while walking in a grocery store parking lot, but still coached the Rush to a victory over the Philadelphia Soul two days later. He coached the game in the team press box with a sling around his arm.

References

External links 
Mike Hohensee (coach) at ArenaFan.com
Mike Hohensee (player) at ArenaFan.com
Mike Hohensee (Interview) at arenafootball.com

1961 births
Living people
People from the San Gabriel Valley
American football quarterbacks
Minnesota Golden Gophers football players
American players of Canadian football
Canadian football quarterbacks
Ottawa Rough Riders players
Toronto Argonauts players
Pittsburgh Gladiators players
Chicago Bears players
Washington Federals/Orlando Renegades players
National Football League replacement players
Indiana Firebirds coaches
Toronto Phantoms coaches
Philadelphia Soul coaches
Chicago Rush coaches
Mt. SAC Mounties football players
Players of American football from Inglewood, California
Washington Commandos coaches
Portland Thunder coaches
Anaheim Piranhas coaches
Iowa Barnstormers coaches
Peoria Pirates coaches